Alaqeh Janban (also Romanized as ʿAlāqeh Janbān) is a village in Sudlaneh Rural District, in the Central District of Quchan County, Razavi Khorasan Province, Iran. At the 2006 census, its population was 212, in 47 families.

References 

Populated places in Quchan County